Dawsonne Drake (1724–1784) was the first British governor of Manila from 1762 to 1764, during the British occupation of the Seven Years' War. Prior to his term as the Manila administrator, he was the governor of White Town from 1742 to 1762.

Governorships
Born in Madras, India (now Chennai, India) in 1724, Dawsonne Drake was the second son of George Drake (4 December 1696 - 1741), a native of Buckland and descendant of Sir Francis Drake, and his wife, Sophia Bugden.

In 1742, Dawsonne Drake joined the British East India Company where he held the position as the clerk. At that time, he also became the governor of White Town, Madras. Because of his faithful service and good connection, he was promoted again and again until he became a member of the Madras Council.

On 2 November 1762, he assumed gubernatorial office as the first British governor after the Battle of Manila (1762). He led the Manila Council, assisted by Claud Russell and Samuel Johnson. During his administration in the Philippines, his term was scandalized by bitter quarrels with various military officers, including Major Fell, Capt. Backhouse, and Capt. Brereto.  Drake "had the difficult tasks of collecting the ransom, promoting trade, and defending the perimeter.  It is no wonder he had difficulties, but it is remarkable that he did so badly."

Post-governorship
Upon his return to Madras in April 1766, he was tried by the Madras Council on criminal charges including extortion from the Chinese community and "abusing his authority to extort money from anyone who came into his power." He was found guilty and dismissed from the Council at Fort St. George, India on 2 December 1767. This sentence was later modified, and he was simply limited in his council rank.

References

 
 
 
 

1724 births
1784 deaths
Governors-General of the Philippines
18th-century British people
Politicians from Chennai
People of Spanish colonial Philippines
Date of birth unknown
Date of death unknown
Place of death unknown
British East India Company civil servants